Theodore Lewis Bates (September 11, 1901 – May 30, 1972) was an American advertising executive who founded a worldwide advertising agency that bears his name: Ted Bates Inc.

Biography
Born in New Haven, Connecticut, Bates attended Phillips-Andover Academy, then graduated from Yale University in 1924. While at Yale he joined Delta Kappa Epsilon fraternity. He founded Ted Bates & Co. in 1940, which evolved into the 21st-century advertising agency Bates 141. His empire launched in Asia in the early 1960s after acquiring a stake in Cathay Advertising from George Patterson, an Australian advertising executive.  Cathay Advertising was used by Bates as a vehicle to drive expansion in the region so that by the late 1960s, Ted Bates Inc. was operating in Manila, Bangkok, Kuala Lumpur, Singapore and Hong Kong.

Personal life
Bates died on May 30, 1972; services were held at St. James' Episcopal Church in Manhattan.

Legacy
In 1982, the American Advertising Federation (AAF) inducted Bates with Charles H. Brower and Bernice Fitz-Gibbon to the Advertising Hall of Fame. His creative partner, advertising maverick Rosser Reeves, described the reasons for Bates' success at the induction: 
There are two things not commonly known which I want to put on the record today. Very early on at one fell swoop, Ted Bates gave away 90 percent of his agency to his key people. When I asked him why, he said, 'Rosser, I would rather own 10 percent of a success than 100 percent of a failure.' And that leads to the other thing. By making us rich and therefore making us work like demons, Ted built an agency that for the first 26 consecutive years did not lose a client...

Notes

References
Staff report (June 1, 1972). Ted Bates, Ad Agency Founder, Dies. New York Times
Ted Bates AAF Hall of Fame listing

1901 births
1972 deaths
American advertising executives
20th-century American businesspeople